Hahn am See is an Ortsgemeinde – a community belonging to a Verbandsgemeinde – in the Westerwaldkreis in Rhineland-Palatinate, Germany.

Geography

The community lies in the Westerwald between Montabaur und Hachenburg. The community belongs to the Verbandsgemeinde of Wallmerod, a kind of collective municipality.

History
Hahn am See, which was mentioned in a document as Hane as early as 1374, lies on one of Germany's oldest roads. The Hohe Straße (“High Road”), which is now Bundesstraße 8, can be traced back to the Völkerwanderung in pre-Christian times. When there was a great water shortage in 1870, a fountain to supply people with water, was built which was fed by a natural spring. The old fountain column still stands today and still gives its cooling wetness.

Amalgamations
With the amalgamation of the communities of Hahn and Niederhahn, the new united community was given the name Hahn am See in 1980.

Politics

Community council
The council is made up of 8 council members who were elected in a majority vote in a municipal election on 7 June 2009.

Town partnerships
There is a partnership arrangement with the French community of Le Verger, which is nurtured by a promotional group.

Culture and sightseeing

The community's core is characterized by the village linden tree, which is more than 100 years old, and the Baroque church from 1726, which is a protected monument.

References

External links
Hahn am See in the collective municipality’s Web pages 
Hierzuland television 

Municipalities in Rhineland-Palatinate
Westerwaldkreis